République is an episodic action-adventure stealth video game developed by Camouflaj and Logan Games and published by GungHo Online Entertainment. The game was originally released for iOS devices but has since expanded to Android, Microsoft Windows and OS X. A PlayStation 4 version, containing all five episodes, was released on March 22, 2016, while a version for the Stadia cloud gaming service was released on September 15, 2020. A VR version debuted on the Oculus Go, followed by a release onto Oculus Quest in July 2019, and Steam on 15 June 2020 (for HTC Vive, Oculus Rift and Valve Index) and Oculus Go. In June 14, 2021, Camouflaj announced an Anniversary Edition of the game for the Nintendo Switch, PlayStation 4 and PlayStation VR which will release on March 10, 2022.

Gameplay
Players communicate with the main character, Hope, through their phone or computer, in order to help her escape. The player controls surveillance cameras in the fictional totalitarian state or corporate republic of République in order to monitor Hope's actions, as well as hack into various electronic devices.

The interface that the player must use is the "OMNI View" software, which allows them to lock and unlock doors, distract patrolling enemies, and obtain information. In some situations, the player must upgrade their OMNI View to higher versions, enabling them to access areas and nodes with stronger security. In the OS X and Windows versions, players will be able to access multiple cameras at once.

Plot

République takes place in an unnamed totalitarian state (similar to George Orwell's 1984), led by its sinister "Overseer"/"Headmaster" named Treglazov (voiced by Dwight Schultz), a powerhouse technology and security mogul with an insane ideology he has peddled most of his life, mostly through books. His latest book, a manifesto he has concocted, is what he has used to initiate his utopia, and has given them to everyone who lives in, and works for it. Within a facility a part of it called "Metamorphosis", Prizrak, the hired guards of the totalitarian state, protect from intruders, and keep in line the adolescents called "Pre-Cals" (short for Pre-Calibration), who are getting mysterious experiments performed on them, and are people who were born and raised in the facility. One Pre-Cal teenager, Hope (voiced by Rena Strober), manages to contact the player through their phone, and requests them to help her escape from Metamorphosis.

Hope and the player receive assistance from Cooper (voiced by James Holloway), an American who works as a Prizrak in Metamorphosis, and has grown a strong hate for it. Other characters include Daniel Markus Zager (voiced by David Hayter), a deceased journalist/revolutionary who leaves audio logs behind for Hope and the player; Quinn Derringer (voiced by Khary Payton) who is the Head of the Prizrak; and Mireille Prideaux (voiced by Jennifer Hale), who serves as a high-ranking official for the facility, and as Hope and every other Pre-Cal's caretaker, and may or may not be an infiltrator who is against Treglazov.

Development
Ryan Payton, founder of Camouflaj, initiated the project because he wanted to "stop complaining about the lack of real games on mobile and start making one". The idea for Hope came about when he was performing a thought experiment about how to make Love Plus for a Western audience. Payton cites Nineteen Eighty-Four as a major influence on the atmosphere. The game also draws inspiration from Metal Gear, the first Resident Evil, and Demon's Souls. The central themes are "voyeurism, paranoia, censorship, and control". Logan co-founder Alexei Tylevich serves as art director; Logan will focus on visual development while Camouflaj handles the gameplay and systems.

On April 11, 2012, Camouflaj launched a Kickstarter crowdfunding campaign to raise $500,000 to help with development costs. The project was funded on May 11, 2012 with a total of $555,662.

Reception

Episode 1: Exordium
Episode 1: Exordium received "generally favorable" reviews, according to review aggregator Metacritic.

Episode 2: Metamorphosis
Episode 2: Metamorphosis received "generally favorable" reviews, according to Metacritic.

Episode 3: Ones and Zeroes
Episode 3: Ones and Zeroes received "generally favorable" reviews, according to Metacritic.

Episode 4: God's Acre
Episode 4: God's Acre received "mixed or average" reviews, according to Metacritic.

Episode 5: Terminus
Episode 5: Terminus received "mixed or average" reviews, according to Metacritic.

References

External links

Camouflaj website
Logan website
Kickstarter page

2013 video games
Action-adventure games
Android (operating system) games
Fiction about photography
Crowdfunded video games
Dystopian video games
Episodic video games
Fiction about government
Experimental medical treatments in fiction
IOS games
Kickstarter-funded video games
Martyrdom in fiction
Video games about mass surveillance
Fiction about mind control
MacOS games
PlayStation 4 games
PlayStation Network games
Propaganda in fiction
Fiction about rebellions
Science fiction video games
Single-player video games
Stealth video games
Stadia games
Video games developed in the United States
Video games featuring female protagonists
Video games featuring non-playable protagonists
Windows games
Works based on Nineteen Eighty-Four